The 2018–19 season is Maccabi Haifa's 61st season in Israeli Premier League, and their 37th consecutive season in the top division of Israeli football.

Club

Kits

 Provider: Nike, Inc.
 Main Sponsor: Volvo
 Secondary Sponsor:  Pointer and Variety Israel

Squad information

Current coaching staff
{|class="wikitable"
|+
! style="background-color:#FFFFFF; color:#000000;" scope=col|Position
! style="background-color:#FFFFFF; color:#000000;" scope=col|Staff
|-

Transfers

In

Out

Pre-season and friendlies

Competitions

Overview

Ligat Ha'Al

Regular season

Regular season table

Results overview

Play-off

Championship round table

Results overview

Results summary

Results by round

State Cup

Round of 32

Round of 16

Toto Cup

Group stage

Semi-final

Final

Statistics

Squad statistics

Updated on 27 May 2019

Goals

Updated on 27 May 2019

Assists

Updated on 20 May 2019

Clean sheets

Updated on 23 April 2019

Disciplinary record (Ligat Ha'Al and State Cup)

Updated on 27 May 2019

Disciplinary record (Toto Cup)

Updated on 27 August 2018

Suspensions

Updated on 20 March 2019

Penalties

Updated on 3 March 2019

Overall

{| class="wikitable" style="text-align: center"
|-
!
!Total
!Home
!Away
!Natural
|-
|align=left| Games played          || 43 || 21 || 22 || 1
|-
|align=left| Games won             || 19 || 9 || 10 || -
|- 
|align=left| Games drawn           || 12 || 4 || 8 || -
|-
|align=left| Games lost             || 12 || 7 || 4 || 1
|-
|align=left| Biggest win             ||  5-0 vs Hapoel Marmorek || 5-0 vs Hapoel Marmorek || 4-0 vs Hapoel Hadera || -
|-
|align=left| Biggest loss       || 0-2 vs Maccabi Tel Aviv 0-2 vs Maccabi Netanya 1-3 vs Hapoel Haifa 1-3 vs Maccabi Tel Aviv 0-2 Bnei Yehuda Tel Aviv 1-3 Hapoel Hadera 0-2 Hapoel Hadera || 0-2 vs Maccabi Netanya 1-3 vs Hapoel Haifa 1-3 vs Maccabi Tel Aviv 0-2 Bnei Yehuda Tel Aviv 1-3 Hapoel Hadera || 0-2 vs Maccabi Tel Aviv 0-2 Hapoel Hadera || 1-2 vs Maccabi Tel Aviv
|-
|align=left| Biggest win (League)    || 2-0 vs F.C. Ashdod 2-0 vs Bnei Sakhnin 2-0 vs Hapoel Be'er Sheva  3-1 vs Hapoel Hadera 2-0 vs Bnei Sakhnin 3-1 vs Hapoel Be'er Sheva  || 2-0 vs F.C. Ashdod 3-1 vs Hapoel Hadera 2-0 vs Bnei Sakhnin 3-1 vs Hapoel Be'er Sheva || 2-0 vs Bnei Sakhnin 2-0 Hapoel Be'er Sheva  || -
|-
|align=left| Biggest loss (League)   || 0-2 vs Maccabi Tel Aviv 0-2 vs Maccabi Netanya 1-3 vs Hapoel Haifa 1-3 vs Maccabi Tel Aviv 0-2 Bnei Yehuda Tel Aviv 1-3 Hapoel Hadera 0-2 Hapoel Hadera || 0-2 vs Maccabi Netanya 1-3 vs Hapoel Haifa 1-3 vs Maccabi Tel Aviv 0-2 Bnei Yehuda Tel Aviv 1-3 Hapoel Hadera || 0-2 vs Maccabi Tel Aviv 0-2 Hapoel Hadera || -
|-
|align=left| Biggest win (Cup)    || 5-0 vs Hapoel Marmorek || 5-0 vs Hapoel Marmorek || - || -
|-
|align=left| Biggest loss (Cup)     || 0-1 vs Bnei Sakhnin || - || 0-1 vs Bnei Sakhnin || -
|-
|align=left| Biggest win (Toto)    ||  4-0 vs Hapoel Hadera || 3-2 vs Hapoel Ironi Kiryat Shmona || 4-0 vs Hapoel Hadera || -
|-
|align=left| Biggest loss (Toto)   || 1-2 vs Maccabi Tel Aviv || - || - || 1-2 vs Maccabi Tel Aviv
|-
|align=left| Goals scored           || 61 || 32 || 28 || 1
|-
|align=left| Goals conceded         || 48 || 27 || 19 || 2
|-
|align=left| Goal difference        || +13 || +5 || +9 || -1
|-
|align=left| Clean sheets            || 11 || 5 || 6 || -
|-
|-
|-
|align=left| Yellow cards          || 91 || 38 || 51 || 2
|-
|align=left| Red cards               || 7 || 3 || 4 || -
|-
|align=left| Most appearances      ||colspan=4| 
|-
|align=left| Most minutes played   || colspan=4| 
|-
|align=left| Most goals        || colspan=4|    Nikita Rukavytsya (13)
|-
|align=left| Most Assist        || colspan=4|  Mohammed Awaed (9)
|-
|align=left|Penalties for   || 2 || 2 || - || -
|-
|align=left|Penalties against   || 5 || 2 || 3 || -
|-
|align=left| Winning rate         || % || % || % || %
|-

References

External links
 Maccabi Haifa website

Maccabi Haifa F.C. seasons
Maccabi Haifa